Cerje is a village at the southeastern end of Pustec Municipality  which is officially recognised as a Macedonian minority zone located in the Korçë County of Albania, near the border with Greece. The village is composed of ethnic Macedonians, which form part of the larger Macedonian minority in Albania. According to Bulgarian sources,  including researches by a Bulgarian scientist from Albania, the local inhabitants are Bulgarians.

History
In 1900, Vasil Kanchov gathered and compiled statistics on demographics in the area and reported that the village of Cerja (Церя) was inhabited by about 120 Bulgarian Christians. In 1904, following the Ilinden Uprising, Cerje came under the Bulgarian Exarchate.

In 1911, the village was recorded by Georgi Trajčev as a Bulgarian village having six houses and 54 inhabitants.

In 1939, on behalf of 15 Bulgarian houses in Cerje Fote Fotev signed a request by the local Bulgarians to the Bulgarian tsaritsa Giovanna requesting her intervention for the protection of the Bulgarian people in Albania - at that time an Italian protectorate.

Demographics
According to a 2007 source, Cerje is the least populous village in Pustec Municipality, having only a small amount of elderly residents.

References

Populated places in Pustec Municipality
Villages in Korçë County
Macedonian communities in Albania